Chadwick is an English surname of Old English origin meaning “town or village of Chad”;and the surname originates in the parish of Rochdale where the family was given land in the township  by William the Conqueror where the family lived for centuries within the village of Chadwick which bears its name, a combination of the given name Ceadda, and the Old English word wic. Notable people with the surname include:

Andrés Chadwick (born 1956), Chilean politician
Alan Chadwick (1909–1980), English organic farming innovator
Allan Chadwick, Australian Paralympic shooter
Arthur Chadwick (1875–1936), English footballer
H. Beatty Chadwick (born 1936), American jailed 14 years for civil contempt of court
Cassie Chadwick (1857–1907), Canadian criminal
Cy Chadwick (born 1969), British actor, director and producer
Cyril Chadwick (1879-1955), English actor
David Chadwick (disambiguation), several people
Drew Chadwick, singer in American reggae pop band Emblem3
Edgar Chadwick (1869–1942), English footballer
Sir Edwin Chadwick (1800–1890), English social reformer
Francis Brooks Chadwick (1850–1942/43), American painter active in France
Frank Chadwick, American game designer and author
French Ensor Chadwick (1844–1919), United States Navy officer who contributed to naval education
George Chadwick (bishop) (1840–1923), Irish Anglican bishop and author
George Whitefield Chadwick (1854–1931), American Romantic composer
George B. Chadwick (1880–1961), American football player and coach
Goretti Chadwick, Samoan-New Zealand stage and television actress, writer, director and tutor
Guy Chadwick (born 1956), English singer, songwriter and guitarist 
Hector Munro Chadwick (1870–1947), English philologist and historian
Helen Chadwick (1953–1996), British sculptor, photographer and installation artist
Henry Chadwick (disambiguation), several people
Sir James Chadwick (1891–1974), English physicist, recipient of the 1935 Nobel Prize in physics for the discovery of the neutron
James Read Chadwick (1844–1905), American gynecologist and medical librarian
Jamie Chadwick (born 1998), English racing driver 
Jeff Chadwick (born 1960), American football player
Jeffrey R. Chadwick, American archeologist
John White Chadwick (1840–1904), American writer and Unitarian clergyman
John Chadwick (1920–1998), English linguist and classical scholar, co-decipherer of the Linear B script
Sir John Chadwick (judge) (born 1941), British judge
June Chadwick (born 1951), English actress
Justin Chadwick (born 1968), English actor and director
Kate Morgan Chadwick, American actress and singer
Les Chadwick (1943–2019), English bass guitarist
Luke Chadwick (born 1980), English footballer
Lynn Chadwick (1914–2003), English artist and sculptor
Margaret Lee Chadwick (1893–1984), nonfiction author, founder and headmistress of the Chadwick School
Maureen Chadwick (born 1959), English screenwriter and dramatist
Miles Chadwick (1880–1940), English footballer
Nick Chadwick (born 1982), English footballer and coach
Nora K. Chadwick (1891–1972), English medievalist
Owen Chadwick (1916–2015), British Anglican priest, academic, writer and historian of Christianity
Peter Chadwick (cricketer) (born 1934), English cricketer
Paul Chadwick (born 1957), American comic-book creator
Paul Chadwick (author) (1902–1972), American pulp magazine author
Rachael Chadwick (born 1990), English professional squash player
Robert Chadwick (1879–1939), New Zealand cricketer
Robert Chadwick (Pennsylvania politician) (1833-1902), American politician
Robert E. Lee Chadwick (1930–2014), American anthropologist and archaeologist
Roy Chadwick (1893–1947), British aircraft design engineer 
Samuel Chadwick (1860–1932), English Methodist minister
Sarah Chadwick (born 1960), Australian actress
Sarah Chadwick (activist) (born 2001), American activist against gun violence
Sonia Chadwick Hawkes (born Sonia Elizabeth Chadwick) (1933–1999), British medieval archaeologist
Stephanie Chadwick (born 1948), New Zealand politician
Stephen F. Chadwick (1825–1895), American Democratic politician
Stephen J. Chadwick (1863–1931), Justice of the Washington Supreme Court
Trevor Chadwick, (1907-1979), Refugee worker in Czechoslovakia, 1939 
E. Wallace Chadwick (1884–1969), American politician 
W. D. Chadwick (1883–1934), American football, baseball and basketball coach

Fictional characters
 Chadwick, character in Jamaica Inn (1939)
 Dr. Chadwick, character and antagonist in Ben 10 (2005-2008)
 Louis Chadwick, character in The White Shadow (1924)
 Rikki Chadwick, character in H2O: Just Add Water (TV series 2006–2010)

References